Sangeet Bangla (Bengali: সঙ্গীত বাংলা) is a Free to Air Indian music television channel owned and managed by Media Worldwide Limited, based in Kolkata, India. The channel was the first venture of the Media Worldwide Network which now has three more music channels Music India, Sangeet Bhojpuri and Sangeet Marathi.

Sangeet Bangla is an iconic Bengali music channel that stands at an unwavering No 1 position and has been ruling the charts in the Bengali music genre since its launch. It is also the preferred choice of Bengali film industry (Tollywood as it is called) to promote their new releases.

On 15 August 2021, on account of India's 75th Independence Day, Sangeet Bangla changed its logo and graphics for the first time since its launch.

About
Sangeet Bangla keeps the audience informed about the latest happenings in Tollywood and plays viewer's choice of songs. The channel also serves as a suitable platform for the film and music industry of Bengal, acting as a perfect media partner to reach the target viewership. Top-notch packaging, high production standards and quality content have positioned the channel as the most preferred choice of the Bengali music loving audience.

Sangeet Bangla is available in most cable networks and all DTH operators across India. It is also available in USA (Dish TV & Yupp TV), and Qatar (Ooredoo).

History
Sangeet Bangla was launched on 15 April 2005 (Bengali New Year), under Sangeet Bangla Network Private Limited, incorporated in Kolkata with a purpose to showcase Bengali culture through the variety of music which it had to offer, ranging from classical to the modern.

The show Howrah Bridge, was earlier anchored by VJ Monalisa which was a hit, with a lot of audience interaction wherein the viewers would send in their requests and the host played them on demand. Not only this, but the morning show like wishing Shubo Janmodin (Happy Birthday) was a grand hit. The USP of the show was that it was hosted by a child artist and children who sent in their birthday information were wished by the host. The show played songs of kid's interest.

Another show that popularised the channel was O Bondhu Tumi Shunte Ke Parcho (O friend are you listening to me) that played romantic numbers requested to be dedicated to their loved ones.

Programming
Tumi Je Amar
SB Superhitz
Non Stop Hits
SB Bondona
Howrah Bridge
Tumi Hansbe Bole
SB Public Demand
SB Lyrical
SB Viral Hits
SB All Time Hits

References

External links

Prashant Chothani interview

Television stations in Kolkata
Bengali-language television channels in India
Music television channels in India
Television channels and stations established in 2005
Music of Bengal
2005 establishments in West Bengal